The 2007 Letran Knights men's basketball team represented Colegio de San Juan de Letran in the 83rd season of the National Collegiate Athletic Association in the Philippines. The men's basketball tournament for the school year 2007-08 began on June 23, 2007, and the host school for the season was Jose Rizal University.

The Knights finished the double round-robin eliminations at second place with 9 wins against 3 losses. After a 4–0 start, they were dealt with their first loss of the season against the hosts, JRU Heavy Bombers. Their win against San Beda in the first-round ensured a #1 finish for the Knights, but Mapúa denied them another 4–0 streak as MVP candidate Kelvin dela Peña lead the Cardinals with an almost triple-double performance. Letran faced San Beda again in the second-round, but the Red Lions avenged their first-round loss thanks to Borgie Hermida's late-game heroics. After the game, some coaching staffs and supporters from both teams engaged in a brawl.

Letran then eliminated JRU in the Final Four to face the defending champions San Beda Red Lions for the first time in the Finals after 57 years. The Knights, however, were swept by the Red Lions in two games. Bryan Faundo and Dino Daa were named members of the Mythical Five.

Roster 

 Depth chart Depth chart

NCAA Season 83 games results 

Elimination games were played in a double round-robin format. All games were aired on Studio 23.

Source: Ubelt.com

Awards

References 

Letran Knights basketball team seasons